The Florey Medal, also known as the CSL Florey Medal and the Florey Medal for Lifetime Achievement, is an Australian award for biomedical research named in honour of Australian Nobel Laureate Howard Florey. The medal is awarded biennially and the recipient receives $50,000 in prize money.

The Medal was first awarded in 1998, the centenary of Florey's birth. It is administered by the Australian Institute of Policy & Science and has been sponsored by F H Faulding, then Mayne (when they took over Fauldings), Merck Sharp & Dohme, and is currently sponsored by CSL Limited.

Recipients
Past recipients include:
1998 – Barry Marshall and Robin Warren for their work on Helicobacter pylori and its role in gastritis and peptic ulcer disease
2000 – Jacques Miller for work on the function of the thymus
2002 – Colin L. Masters for Alzheimer's disease research
2004 – Peter Colman for structural biology research
2006 – Ian Frazer for development of the cervical cancer vaccine Gardasil
2009 –  for research and clinical application in lysosomal disorders
2011 – Graeme Clark for his invention of the bionic ear
2013 – Ruth Bishop for her work on understanding the rotavirus and the creation of a vaccine
2015 – Perry Bartlett for his discoveries that have transformed our understanding of the brain 
2017 –  Elizabeth Rakoczy from the Lions Eye Institute at the University of Western Australia for her work on a new gene therapy for wet age-related macular degeneration.
2019 – David Vaux and Andreas Strasser of the Walter and Eliza Hall Institute for their work on revealing the links between cell death and cancer.

See also

 List of biomedical science awards
 List of awards named after people

References

Australian science and technology awards
Biomedical awards
Awards established in 1998